Kinsler is a surname. Notable people with the surname include:

Ian Kinsler (born 1982), Israeli-American baseball player
William Kinsler (1867–1963), American baseball player